The Estadio Municipal de Ensenada is a multi-use stadium in Ensenada, Baja California, Mexico. It is used mostly for football matches and is the home stadium for Cuervos de Ensenada. It was also planned to be the home venue for Atlético Ensenada. The stadium has a capacity of 7,600 people.

References

External links

Sports venues in Baja California
Estadio Municipal de Ensenada
Athletics (track and field) venues in Mexico